The President William Jefferson Clinton Birthplace Home National Historic Site is located in Hope, Arkansas.  Built in 1917 by Dr. H. S. Garrett, in this house the 42nd president of the United States, Bill Clinton, spent the first four years of his life, having been born on August 19, 1946, at Julia Chester Hospital in Hope, Arkansas. The house was owned by Clinton's maternal  grandparents, Edith Grisham and James Eldridge Cassidy, and they cared for him when his mother, Virginia, was away working as an anesthetist in New Orleans.<ref name="Maraniss"></cite>
</ref>

On May 19, 1994, the site was added to the National Register of Historic Places (as "Bill Clinton Birthplace"). Tours were offered by the Clinton Birthplace Foundation. In accordance with the Omnibus Public Land Management Act of 2009 (§7002), the Secretary of the Interior accepted the property on December 14, 2010, establishing it as a national historic site and a unit of the National Park System. This change in status was originally proposed by Senator Mark Pryor of Arkansas.  Bill Clinton and Secretary of the Interior Ken Salazar formally dedicated the site on April 16, 2011.

See also
 National Register of Historic Places listings in Hempstead County, Arkansas
 List of areas in the United States National Park System#National Historic Sites
 Presidential memorials in the United States

References

External links
 Official NPS website
"Life Portrait of Bill Clinton", from C-SPAN's American Presidents: Life Portraits, broadcast from the Clinton Center and Birthplace, December 20, 1999

Houses completed in 1917
Birthplace
Buildings and monuments honoring American presidents in the United States
Houses on the National Register of Historic Places in Arkansas
National Historic Sites in Arkansas
Protected areas established in 2010
Presidential homes in the United States
Houses in Hempstead County, Arkansas
Museums in Hempstead County, Arkansas
Historic house museums in Arkansas
Presidential museums in Arkansas
Biographical museums in Arkansas
2010 establishments in Arkansas
Birthplaces of individual people
Individually listed contributing properties to historic districts on the National Register in Arkansas
National Register of Historic Places in Hempstead County, Arkansas